The 2022–23 UEFA Nations League B was the second division of the 2022–23 edition of the UEFA Nations League, the third season of the international football competition involving the men's national teams of the 55 member associations of UEFA.

Format
League B consisted of 16 UEFA members ranked from 17–32 in the 2022–23 UEFA Nations League access list, split into four groups of four. Each team played six matches within their group, using the home-and-away round-robin format in June (quadruple matchdays) and September 2022 (double matchdays). The winners of each group were promoted to the 2024–25 UEFA Nations League A, and the fourth-placed team of each group were relegated to the 2024–25 UEFA Nations League C.

Teams

Team changes
The following were the team changes of League B from the 2020–21 season:

Seeding
In the 2022–23 access list, UEFA ranked teams based on the 2020–21 Nations League overall ranking. The seeding pots for the league phase were confirmed on 22 September 2021, and were based on the access list ranking.

The draw for the league phase took place at the UEFA headquarters in Nyon, Switzerland on 16 December 2021, 18:00 CET. Each group contained one team from each pot. For political reasons, Russia and Ukraine (due to the Russian military intervention in Ukraine) could not be drawn in the same group. Due to restrictions of excessive travel, Armenia, Israel and Iceland could not all be in the same group.

Groups
The fixture list was confirmed by UEFA on 17 December 2021, the day following the draw. The fixture list for Group 1 was amended due to the postponement of Path A of UEFA qualifying for the World Cup.

Times are CEST (UTC+2), as listed by UEFA (local times, if different, are in parentheses).

Group 1

Group 2

Group 3

Group 4

Goalscorers

Overall ranking
The 16 League B teams were ranked 17th to 32nd overall in the 2022–23 UEFA Nations League according to the following rules:
The teams finishing first in the groups were ranked 17th to 20th according to the results of the league phase, not taking into account results against the fourth-placed team.
The teams finishing second in the groups were ranked 21st to 24th according to the results of the league phase, not taking into account results against the fourth-placed team.
The teams finishing third in the groups were ranked 25th to 28th according to the results of the league phase, not taking into account results against the fourth-placed team.
The teams finishing fourth in Groups 1, 3 and 4 were ranked 29th to 31st according to the results of the league phase.
Russia, disqualified from the competition and placed fourth in their group, was ranked 32nd.

Euro 2024 qualifying play-offs

The four best teams in League B according to the overall ranking that do not qualify for UEFA Euro 2024 through the qualifying group stage will compete in the play-offs, with the winners qualifying for the final tournament.

Key
GW Group winner from Nations League A, B or C
 Team is assured at least a play-off spot based on Nations League ranking, but may still qualify directly
 Banned from qualifying competition

Notes

References

External links

League B
Sports events affected by the 2022 Russian invasion of Ukraine